Durdle Door (sometimes written Durdle Dor) is a natural limestone arch on the Jurassic Coast near Lulworth in Dorset, England. It is privately owned by the Weld Family who own the Lulworth Estate, but it is also open to the public.

Geology 
The form of the coastline around Durdle Door is controlled by its geology—both by the contrasting hardnesses of the rocks, and by the local patterns of faults and folds. The arch has formed on a concordant coastline where bands of rock run parallel to the shoreline. The rock strata are almost vertical, and the bands of rock are quite narrow. Originally a band of resistant Portland limestone ran along the shore, the same band that appears one mile along the coast forming the narrow entrance to Lulworth Cove.  Behind this is a  band of weaker, easily eroded rocks, and behind this is a stronger and much thicker band of chalk, which forms the Purbeck Hills. These steeply dipping rocks are part of the Lulworth crumple, itself part of the broader Purbeck Monocline, produced by the building of the Alps during the mid-Cenozoic.

Around this part of the coast nearly all of the limestone has been removed by sea erosion, whilst the remainder forms the small headland which includes the arch. Erosion at the western end of the limestone band has resulted in the arch formation.  UNESCO teams monitor the condition of both the arch and adjacent beach.

The  isthmus that joins the limestone to the chalk is made of a  band of Portland limestone, a narrow and compressed band of Cretaceous Wealden clays and sands, and then narrow bands of greensand and sandstone.

In Man O' War Bay, the small bay immediately east of Durdle Door, the band of Portland and Purbeck limestone has not been entirely eroded away, and is visible above the waves as Man O'War Rocks. Similarly, offshore to the west, the eroded limestone outcrop forms a line of small rocky islets called (from east to west) The Bull, The Blind Cow, The Cow, and The Calf.

As the coastline in this area is generally an eroding landscape, the cliffs are subject to occasional rockfalls and landslides; a particularly large slide occurred just to the east of Durdle Door in April 2013, resulting in destruction of part of the South West Coast Path.

Etymology 
There is a dearth of early written records about the arch, though it has kept a name given to it probably over a thousand years ago. In the late 18th century there is a description of the "magnificent arch of Durdle-rock Door", and early 19th-century maps called it "Duddledoor" and "Durdle" or "Dudde Door". In 1811 the first Ordnance Survey map of the area named it as "Dirdale Door". Similar names in the region include Durlston Bay and Durlston Head further east, where a coastal stack suggests the existence of an earlier arch, and the Thurlestone, an arched rock in the neighbouring county of Devon to the west. The Door part of the name probably maintains its modern meaning, referring to the arched shape of the rock; in the late 19th century there is reference to it being called the "Barn-door", and it is described as being "sufficiently high for a good-sized sailing boat to pass through it."

In literature and popular culture 
Music videos have been filmed at Durdle Door, including parts of Tears for Fears' "Shout", Billy Ocean's "Loverboy", Cliff Richard's "Saviour's Day" and Bruce Dickinson's "Tears of the Dragon".

The landscape around Durdle Door has been used in scenes in several films, including Wilde (1997) starring Stephen Fry, Nanny McPhee starring Emma Thompson, the 1967 production of Far From The Madding Crowd (the latter also filmed around nearby Scratchy Bottom), and the Bollywood film Housefull 3. In 2022, Durdle Door was where the Thirteenth Doctor (Jodie Whittaker) regenerated into the Fourteenth Doctor (David Tennant), in the Doctor Who episode "The Power of the Doctor". Ron Dawson's children's story Scary Bones meets the Dinosaurs of the Jurassic Coast creates a myth of how Durdle Door came to be, as an 'undiscovered' dinosaur called Durdle Doorus is magically transformed into rock.

Dorset-born Arthur Moule, a friend of Thomas Hardy and missionary to China, wrote these lines about Durdle Door for his 1879 book of poetry Songs of heaven and home, written in a foreign land:

See also 

 Arch of Cabo San Lucas
 Delicate Arch and Landscape Arch in the USA
 Durdle Pier, Isle of Portland
 Étretat, France
 Geology of Dorset
 Green Bridge of Wales
 Rocher Percé, Québec, Canada
 Stair Hole
 Swyre Head, Chaldon Down and Bat's Head, to the west
 List of Dorset beaches

References

Further reading 
 Arkell, W.J., 1978. The Geology of the Country around Weymouth, Swanage, Corfe and Lulworth, 4th pr.. London: Geological Survey of Great Britain, HMSO.
 Davies, G.M., 1956. A Geological Guide to the Dorset Coast, 2nd ed.. London: Adam & Charles Black.
 Perkins, J.W., 1977. Geology Explained in Dorset. London: David & Charles.

External links 

"Caves, Arches & Stacks" Southwest Coastal Group
"Durdle Door: Past and Future" animation
 Section of Lulworth Crumple, labelled diagram by Ian West (2013)
Durdle Door Educational Activity Sheet for Kids at EasyScienceforKids.

Landforms of Dorset
Geology of Dorset
Jurassic Coast
Natural arches of England
Tourist attractions in Dorset